Trenerry is a surname. Notable people with the surname include:

 Bill Trenerry (1892–1975), Australian cricketer
 Ted Trenerry (1897–1983), Australian cricketer